The men's 10,000 metres event at the 1936 Olympic Games took place August 2.  The final was won by Ilmari Salminen of Finland.

Results

Final

Key: DNF = Did not finish

References

Athletics at the 1936 Summer Olympics
10,000 metres at the Olympics
Men's events at the 1936 Summer Olympics